The 1979 Saint Elias earthquake occurred near noon local time on the 28th of February. It measured 7.4–7.6. Though the maximum recorded Modified Mercalli intensity was VII (Very strong), damages were minimal and there were no casualties due to the remoteness of the faulting. The epicenter lies near the Alaskan border between America and Canada.

Tectonic setting
Southern Alaska lies along the eastern portion of the Aleutian Trench, where the Pacific plate subducts underneath the North American plate, though in the area near the earthquake the zone begins to transition to continental underthrusting. Most of the activity in the area occurs to the west, such as the devastating 1964 Alaska earthquake where there is a clear subduction zone. However, near the earthquake there exists a complex zone of deformation as faulting transitions from a subduction zone to nearly pure strike slip faulting. In this transition zone, the continental Yakutat block impedes subduction, but allows for shallow thrusting events such as this one. A seismic gap exists here; it last ruptured in the 1899 Yakutat Bay earthquakes.

Earthquake
The earthquake struck near the border between Yukon and Alaska at around noon local time on February the 28th. According to the United States Geological Survey, the surface-wave magnitude was 7.1, however it was also reported as high as 7.7 . The moment magnitude was evaluated to be 7.4–7.6.

It may have partially ruptured the Yakataga seismic gap that had previously ruptured during the large sequences of earthquakes in 1899. The tectonic setting around the epicenter region is described as complex. The region is the junction between the strike-slip Fairweather, Denali, Totschunda and Duke River faults in the east. Meanwhile, to the west, subduction is ongoing at the Aleutian Trench.

Shallow thrust faulting as well as strike-slip faulting was responsible for the earthquake, possibly along a Décollement. The earthquake accommodated around 30% of the accumulated stress build up since the 1899 events in the area. There is little consensus on the main fault(s) responsible for the earthquake, but the most likely culprits are the Chugach-Saint Elias, Coal Glacier, Chaix Hills, Malaspina, or Esker Creek faults. No foreshock sequence was observed. There were surprisingly few aftershocks for an event of the size, with the largest only reaching magnitude 5.4. The aftershock distribution may indicate that the Malaspina fault was involved in the rupture of this event. The largest aftershocks displayed a variety of focal mechanisms, with some being thrust, some being strike-slip, and others as a result of normal faulting.

Tsunami and landslides
At Sitka, a  tsunami was recorded. The tsunami measured  in Yakutat. An erroneous entry that was included in a 1979 report stated a  tsunami occurred. Many snow avalanches were aerially observed to the south and south-east of the epicentral region. Multiple large (6-10 Mm³) rock avalanches fell from slopes near the Seward Glacier, and multiple large (3–5 km2) landslides were triggered. The mainshock and aftershock distribution on land suggest the tsunami was triggered by a small and local landslide.

Damage
The earthquake struck the eastern part of the Chugach Mountains, a sparsely populated region consisting of glaciers. Many people reported difficulties in standing up. Some minor damage was reported in Border City, Cape Yakataga, the Juneau area, Valdez, and Yakutat. In Canada's Yukon Province, damage occurred in Beaver Creek, Burwash Landing, Destruction Bay, and Kluane Lake Fishing Camp.

See also
List of earthquakes in 1979
List of earthquakes in the United States
List of earthquakes in Alaska
List of earthquakes in Canada

References

Sources

 
 
 
 
 
 
 
 
 
 

1979 earthquakes
Earthquakes in Alaska
Earthquakes in Canada
Tsunamis in the United States
1979 in Alaska
February 1979 events in the United States
1979 tsunamis
1979 in Yukon